Clifford Coulter was an American blues, R&B and jazz guitarist and keyboardist.

He released three albums, 1970's East Side San Jose with Billy Ingram and Joe Provost on drums.  (Impulse! Records), 1971's Do It Now: Worry About It Later (Impulse! Records) and 1980's The Better Part of Me (Columbia Records).

The latter record was produced by Bill Withers, and included contributions from Russ Kunkel, Ron E. Beck, and Jerry Perez, and is an Allmusic album pick.

Discography
East Side San Jose (Impulse!, 1970)
Do It Now! (Impulse!, 1971)
The Better Part of Me (Columbia, 1980)

With Mel Brown
I'd Rather Suck My Thumb (Impulse!, 1969)
With Sonny Fortune
Waves of Dreams (Horizon, 1976)
With John Lee Hooker
Free Beer and Chicken (ABC, 1974)
With Michael White
Father Music, Mother Dance (Impulse!, 1974)

References

Year of birth missing (living people)
Living people
American blues guitarists
American male guitarists
American blues pianists
American male pianists
21st-century American pianists
21st-century American male musicians